The Inatsisartut, also known as the Parliament of Greenland in English, is the unicameral parliament (legislative branch) of Greenland, an autonomous territory in the Danish realm. Established in 1979, it meets in Inatsisartut, on the islet of Nuuk Center in central Nuuk.

There are 31 members, who are elected for four-year periods by proportional representation.

History of the parliament
The Parliament of Greenland succeeded the provincial council on 1 May 1979. The parliament is led by a presidency comprising four members of the parliament, and the chairman. There are 31 members in the assembly.

Speaker
 
The speaker is the presiding officer of the Inatsisartut. The speaker determines which members may speak, and is responsible for maintaining order. On October 3, 2018, Siumut had Vivian Motzfeldt, the outgoing Foreign Minister, elected. On the 16th of April 2021, Hans Enoksen was elected again.

The speaker is nominated by the prime minister immediately following a general election and is confirmed by members; the speaker appoints four deputies.

Current members

Recent results
The most recent elections were held on 8 April 2021.

Composition since 1979 
Source

See also

Politics of Greenland:
Elections in Greenland
Prime Minister of Greenland
Politics of the Faroe Islands (the other constituent country of the Kingdom of Denmark:
Elections in the Faroe Islands
Løgtinget, the parliament of the Faroe Islands
Prime Minister of the Faroe Islands
Politics in the Kingdom of Denmark:
Elections in Denmark
Folketinget, the parliament of the Kingdom of Denmark
Prime Minister of Denmark (list)
The unity of the Realm, consisting of Denmark proper, the Faroe Islands, and Greenland
Other parliaments in the Nordic countries:
Eduskunta (Finland)
Lagting (Åland)
Alþing (Iceland)
Storting (Norway)
Riksdag (Sweden)

References

External links 
 

Politics of Greenland
Political organisations based in Greenland
Politics of Denmark
Greenland
Greenland
1979 establishments in Greenland
Greenland
Parliament of Greenland